Krasny Bogatyr is a rural locality (a settlement) in Andreyevskoye Rural Settlement, Sudogodsky District, Vladimir Oblast, Russia. The population was 966 as of 2010. There are 12 streets.

Geography 
Krasny Bogatyr is located 28 km southwest of Sudogda (the district's administrative centre) by road. Bolotsky is the nearest rural locality.

References 

Rural localities in Sudogodsky District